The Chile Olympic football team (also known as Chile under-23, Chile U-23) represents Chile in international football competitions at the Olympic Games and Pan American Games. Since the 1992 tournament, the team is limited to players under the age of 23, except three overage players. The team is controlled by the Federación de Fútbol de Chile (FFCh). Combined with pre-1992 tournaments, Chile has qualified on four occasions to the Summer Olympics, winning a bronze medal in 2000.

Competitive record

Pre-Olympic Tournament

Olympic Games

Pan American Games

Matches

1928 Summer Olympics

Preliminary round

Consolation first round

Consolation final 

 Note: The Netherlands wins after drawing of lots but the Cup was awarded to Chile

1952 Summer Olympics

Preliminary round

1984 Summer Olympics

Group stage

Quarterfinals

2000 Summer Olympics

Group stage

Quarterfinals

Semifinals

Bronze-medal match

Players

Current squad
The following 23 players were called up for the training microcycle from 21 to 25 January 2023 with views to the 2023 Pan American Games.

Caps and goals updated as of 31 August 2022 after the match against Peru U23.

Players in italics are over 23 years old.

Overage players in Olympic Games

Honours 

Summer Olympics:
  Bronze medalists (1): 2000
Pan American Games:
  Silver medalists (1): 1987
 Bronze medalists (2): 1951, 1963
 South American Games:
  Gold medalists (1): 2018
 CONMEBOL Pre-Olympic Tournament:
 Runners-up (2): 1984, 2000
 Fourth place (1): 2004

Friendlies

 Torneo Internacional de Guayaquil::
 Winners: 1994

See also
 Chile national football team
 Chile national under-20 football team
 Chile national under-17 football team

References

External links
Chile under-23 at ANFP website 

Chile national football team
South American national under-23 association football teams
South American Olympic national association football teams
Youth sport in Chile